Hans Maarten van den Brink (is a Dutch journalist and writer. He was born in 1956 in Oegstgeest. He began his career as an art editor at NRC Handelsblad. He worked in Spain for a few years as foreign correspondent, which provided material for a couple of his books (The Thirty Days of Saint Isidore, on bullfighting; and Spain: Body and Soul). He also worked in television. He is best known for his novella On the Water (1998) which was translated in many languages and won numerous literary prizes.

References

1956 births
Living people
Dutch male writers
Dutch journalists
People from Oegstgeest